Cycling at the 1984 Summer Paralympics consisted of seven road cycling events, six for men and one for women.

Medal summary

References 

 

1984 Summer Paralympics events
1984
Paralympics
1984 in road cycling